Rodniki (Kazakh: Родники) is the name of several inhabited localities in Russia and one rural locality in Kazakhstan.

Akmola Province (Kazakhstan) 
Rodniki, Arshaly District, Akmola Province, a rural locality of Kazakhstan.

Republic of Bashkortostan
As of 2012, three rural localities in the Republic of Bashkortostan bear this name:
Rodniki, Belebeyevsky District, Republic of Bashkortostan, a village in Malinovsky Selsoviet of Belebeyevsky District
Rodniki, Iglinsky District, Republic of Bashkortostan, a village in Ivano-Kazansky Selsoviet of Iglinsky District
Rodniki, Kaltasinsky District, Republic of Bashkortostan, a village in Kelteyevsky Selsoviet of Kaltasinsky District

Belgorod Oblast
As of 2012, one rural locality in Belgorod Oblast bears this name:
Rodniki, Belgorod Oblast, a khutor in Veydelevsky District

Bryansk Oblast
As of 2012, one rural locality in Bryansk Oblast bears this name:
Rodniki, Bryansk Oblast, a settlement in Bolshezhukovsky Rural Administrative Okrug of Dyatkovsky District;

Chelyabinsk Oblast
As of 2012, two rural localities in Chelyabinsk Oblast bear this name:
Rodniki, Kartalinsky District, Chelyabinsk Oblast, a settlement in Annensky Selsoviet of Kartalinsky District
Rodniki, Troitsky District, Chelyabinsk Oblast, a settlement in Rodnikovsky Selsoviet of Troitsky District

Ivanovo Oblast
As of 2012, one urban locality in Ivanovo Oblast bears this name:
Rodniki, Ivanovo Oblast, a town in Rodnikovsky District

Kaliningrad Oblast
As of 2012, three rural localities in Kaliningrad Oblast bear this name:
, a settlement in Nizovsky Rural Okrug of Guryevsky District
Rodniki, Pravdinsky District, Kaliningrad Oblast, a settlement under the administrative jurisdiction of the Town of District Significance of Pravdinsk in Pravdinsky District
Rodniki, Zelenogradsky District, Kaliningrad Oblast, a settlement in Kovrovsky Rural Okrug of Zelenogradsky District

Krasnodar Krai
As of 2012, one rural locality in Krasnodar Krai bears this name:
Rodniki, Krasnodar Krai, a settlement in Rodnikovsky Rural Okrug of Belorechensky District

Krasnoyarsk Krai
As of 2012, one rural locality in Krasnoyarsk Krai bears this name:
Rodniki, Krasnoyarsk Krai, a selo in Rodnikovsky Selsoviet of Sharypovsky District

Kurgan Oblast
As of 2012, one rural locality in Kurgan Oblast bears this name:
Rodniki, Kurgan Oblast, a village in Starikovsky Selsoviet of Shumikhinsky District

Moscow Oblast
As of 2012, two inhabited localities in Moscow Oblast bear this name:

Urban localities
Rodniki, Ramensky District, Moscow Oblast, a suburban (dacha) settlement under the administrative jurisdiction of Rodniki Suburban Settlement in Ramensky District

Rural localities
Rodniki, Serpukhovsky District, Moscow Oblast, a village in Dankovskoye Rural Settlement of Serpukhovsky District

Novgorod Oblast
As of 2012, one rural locality in Novgorod Oblast bears this name:
Rodniki, Novgorod Oblast, a village under the administrative jurisdiction of the Settlement of Lyubytinskoye in Lyubytinsky District

Novosibirsk Oblast
As of 2012, one rural locality in Novosibirsk Oblast bears this name:
Rodniki, Novosibirsk Oblast, a settlement in Toguchinsky District

Orenburg Oblast
As of 2012, one rural locality in Orenburg Oblast bears this name:
Rodniki, Orenburg Oblast, a village in Gavrilovsky Selsoviet of Saraktashsky District

Penza Oblast
As of 2012, two rural localities in Penza Oblast bear this name:
Rodniki, Luninsky District, Penza Oblast, a selo in Rodnikovsky Selsoviet of Luninsky District
Rodniki, Nikolsky District, Penza Oblast, a settlement in Maissky Selsoviet of Nikolsky District

Perm Krai
As of 2012, two rural localities in Perm Krai bear this name:
Rodniki, Dobryanka, Perm Krai, a settlement under the administrative jurisdiction of the town of krai significance of Dobryanka
Rodniki, Solikamsky District, Perm Krai, a selo in Solikamsky District

Rostov Oblast
As of 2012, one rural locality in Rostov Oblast bears this name:
Rodniki, Rostov Oblast, a khutor in Rodnikovskoye Rural Settlement of Kagalnitsky District

Ryazan Oblast
As of 2012, one rural locality in Ryazan Oblast bears this name:
Rodniki, Ryazan Oblast, a settlement in Protasyevo-Uglyansky Rural Okrug of Chuchkovsky District

Stavropol Krai
As of 2012, one rural locality in Stavropol Krai bears this name:
Rodniki, Stavropol Krai, a selo in Zolotarevsky Selsoviet of Ipatovsky District

Sverdlovsk Oblast
As of 2012, one rural locality in Sverdlovsk Oblast bears this name:
Rodniki, Sverdlovsk Oblast, a village in Artyomovsky District

Republic of Tatarstan
As of 2012, one rural locality in the Republic of Tatarstan bears this name:
Rodniki, Republic of Tatarstan, a selo in Alexeyevsky District

Tver Oblast
As of 2012, one rural locality in Tver Oblast bears this name:
Rodniki, Tver Oblast, a village in Moldinskoye Rural Settlement of Udomelsky District

Udmurt Republic
As of 2012, one rural locality in the Udmurt Republic bears this name:
Rodniki, Udmurt Republic, a village in Bulaysky Selsoviet of Uvinsky District

Volgograd Oblast
As of 2012, one rural locality in Volgograd Oblast bears this name:
Rodniki, Volgograd Oblast, a khutor in Strelnoshirokovsky Selsoviet of Dubovsky District

Voronezh Oblast
As of 2012, two rural localities in Voronezh Oblast bear this name:
Rodniki, Ostrogozhsky District, Voronezh Oblast, a khutor in Boldyrevskoye Rural Settlement of Ostrogozhsky District
Rodniki, Repyovsky District, Voronezh Oblast, a khutor in Rossoshanskoye Rural Settlement of Repyovsky District

Yaroslavl Oblast
As of 2012, one rural locality in Yaroslavl Oblast bears this name:
Rodniki, Yaroslavl Oblast, a village in Pokrovsky Rural Okrug of Lyubimsky District